Eulophia venosa, commonly known as the pointed corduroy orchid, is a plant in the orchid family and is native to India, parts of Southeast Asia as well as New Guinea and northern Australia. It is a deciduous, terrestrial orchid with one large and one small leaf and between six and twenty pale green or yellowish flowers with purple markings. It grows in rainforest and grassy forests.

Description 
The flowers are resupinate and shaped like a star. The middle lobe turns downwards and is wavy but the side lobes are upright. Flowering occurs between July and November.

Taxonomy and naming
The pointed corduroy orchid was first formally described in 1858 by Ferdinand von Mueller who gave it the name Dipodium venosum and published the description in Fragmenta phytographiae Australiae. In 1873, George Bentham changed the name to Eulophia venosa and published the change in Flora Australiensis. The specific epithet (venosa) is a Latin word meaning "veiny".

Distribution and habitat
Eulophia venosa grows in woodland, grassy forest and on the edge of rainforests. It is variously reported as occurring in northern Queensland, the Northern Territory, New Guinea, India, Indonesia, Malaysia, and Taiwan.

References 

venosa
Orchids of New South Wales
Endemic orchids of Australia
Plants described in 1858